Friede is both a given name and surname. Notable people with the name include:

Friede Springer (born 1942), German publisher
Eleanor Friede (died 2008), American book editor
Mike Friede (born 1957), American football player
Oscar Friede (1882–1943), American tug of war athlete